Iowa Highway 128 is a state highway entirely within Clayton County, in northeastern Iowa.  It begins at Iowa 13 northeast of Elkader and ends at U.S. Highway 52 (US 52) north of Garnavillo.  The highway was originally part of Iowa 56 before becoming its own route.  Iowa 128's route remains the same as when it was first designated.

Route description
It passes through rolling farmland on the western edge of the Driftless Area, a geologically distinct area of northeastern Iowa characterized by undulating terrain, high bluffs, and low river valleys.

History
When the primary highway system was created in 1920, what is now Iowa 128 was designated as a part of Primary Road No. 56 (No. 56).  That road began in West Union and traveled east to Elkader, where it was joined by No. 10 / No. 13.  The three routes shared  before No. 56 split away to the east.  It then joined No. 20 and headed southeast to its eastern end in Guttenberg.  In 1924, No. 56 was shortened to end at No. 10 / No. 13 in Elkader.  The overlappings along No. 10 / No. 13 and No. 20 were removed and the remaining standalone section became No. 128.

Major intersections

References

128